Ponnamanda is a village in Razole Mandal, East Godavari district in the state of Andhra Pradesh in India.

Geography 

Demographics 
 India census, Ponnamanda had a population of 7822, out of which 3884 were male and 3938 were female. The population of children below 6 years of age was 9%. The literacy rate of the village was 80%.

References 

Villages in Razole mandal